Jack Elliot Sings is an album by American folk musician Ramblin' Jack Elliott, released in Great Britain in 1957. Elliott's name is misspelled on the cover.

History
The original release had his name misspelled and was a 10-inch LP. In 1960, four of the songs were released on an EP titled Jack Elliott.

The album was recorded in February and March 1956 by John R.T. Davis at his home in Burnham, Buckinghamshire, England. It is an obscure release in Elliott's catalog that even collectors aren't aware of.

Reception

Writing for Allmusic, music critic Richie Unterberger wrote of the album "There isn't anything here remarkably different from most of Elliott's other vintage folk releases, but it's a good no-frills set..."

Track listing
All song Traditional unless otherwise noted.

Side one
"Alabama Bound"
"Good Morning Blues"
"Talking Blues"
"Rocky Mountain Belle"

Side two
""Jesse Fuller's San Francisco Blues" (Jesse Fuller) 
"Fifteen Cents"
"Mule Skinners" (Jimmie Rodgers, Vaughn Horton)
"John Henry"

Personnel
Ramblin' Jack Elliott – vocals, guitar, harmonica
June Elliott – banjo (on "Rocky Mountain Belle")
Liner notes – Alexis Korner

References

External links
Ramblin' Jack Elliott Illustrated discography

1957 albums
Ramblin' Jack Elliott albums
77 Records albums